The High School for Construction Trades Engineering and Architecture (HS for CTEA) is a New York City Department of Education Career and Technical Education (CTE) school. This school was established in 2006 by the New York State Department of Education. It was intended to support its students to the fields of architecture, engineering or construction trades. In the 2009–2010 school year this high school had its first graduating class. This school is separated into three different majors architecture, engineering and construction trades. Each of them having a four-year course of study.

Extracurricular activities
Bring Change 2 Mind
Boys Soccer Club
Chess Club
Dance Club
Debate Club
Dream Catchers
FIRST Robotics
Fitness Club
Girls Basketball/Soccer Club
Genders & Sexualities Alliance
History Club
Homework Club
Music Club
Relationship Abuse Prevention Program
Student Government Organization
SkillsUSA
Stock Market Club
Tabletop Gaming Club
Video Game Club
Volleyball Club

Sports - 
Public School Athletic League 
 Baseball Boys Varsity - AAA Eastern
 Basketball Boys Jr. Varsity - Queens I
 Basketball Boys Varsity - Queens AA II
 Basketball Girls Varsity - Queens B East
 Cricket Coed Varsity - Queens III
 Cross Country Boys
 Cross Country Girls
 Handball Girls Varsity - Queens III
 Indoor Track Boys 
 Indoor Track Girls
 Outdoor Track Boys
 Outdoor Track Girls 
 Soccer Girls Jr. Varsity - Division III
 Soccer Girls Varsity - Queens A
 Softball Girls Jr. Varsity - Queens II
 Softball Girls Varsity - Queens AA
 Volleyball Girls Varsity - Queens A South/West
 Wrestling Girls Varsity - Brooklyn/Queens

Career and technical education majors

 Construction Trades
 Engineering
 Architecture

References

 
 
 
 
 
 

Public high schools in Queens, New York
Ozone Park, Queens